Prosopocera lactator, the Turquoise Longhorn, is a species of flat-faced longhorn beetles in the subfamily Lamiinae.

Subspecies
 Prosopocera lactator lactator (Fabricius, 1801)
 Prosopocera lactator meridionalis Jordan, 1903
 Prosopocera lactator poggei Harold, 1878

Description
The colors and markings of these longhorn beetles are quite variable. Usually they are brown-colored, with large light greenish or whitish patches on the elytra and pronotum and turquoise leg markings. The coloration of said greenish-white patches derives from the orientation of three-dimensional photonic-crystal grains present in the scales. These beetles feed exclusively on Cashew (Anacardium occidentale). Females lay their eggs in the stems and branches of the Buffalo Thorn (Ziziphus mucronata).

Distribution
This species can be found in Democratic Republic of the Congo, Guinea, Malawi, Mozambique, Senegal, Somalia, South Africa, Tanzania and Uganda.

References
  Biolib
 Worldwide Cerambycoidea Photo Gallery
 Photographs from South Africa
 Jean-Franc¸ois Colomer, Priscilla Simonis, Annick Bay, Peter Cloetens, Heikki Suhonen, Marie Rassart, Cedric Vandenbem and Jean Pol Vigneron  Photonic polycrystal in the greenish-white scales of the African longhorn beetle Prosopocera lactator
 Living Space

Prosopocerini

Beetles described in 1801
Taxa named by Johan Christian Fabricius
Beetles of Africa
Beetles of the Democratic Republic of the Congo
Insects of Malawi
Fauna of Guinea
Insects of Mozambique
Fauna of Senegal
Insects of Somalia
Insects of South Africa
Insects of Tanzania
Insects of Uganda